No. 42 Squadron is an active transport squadron of the Royal New Zealand Air Force (RNZAF). It was formed at Rongotai Airport (Wellington) in December 1943 to provide a communications service around New Zealand, initially using impressed civilian types. It was briefly officially disbanded in 1946, but its aircraft continued with general purpose operations at RNZAF Station Ohakea (near Bulls). When reformed, the squadron was equipped with various numbers of North American Harvard, Auster, Grumman Avenger, Airspeed Oxford, de Havilland Devon, North American P-51 Mustang and Douglas Dakota aircraft.

TBF Avengers flown by 42 Squadron pilots were involved in the first aerial topdressing trials carried out in the world, spreading superphosphate fertiliser alongside the runways at RNZAF Ohakea. Their main purpose was to tow gunnery targets (drogues and banners) for air-to-air gunnery and for the navy and army. The P-51 Mustang also provided high-speed towing of banner targets, especially for de Havilland Vampire jets, and was used extensively for co-operation in army manoeuvres.

Transformation and VIP role 

The role of the squadron gradually changed to VIP flights (Dakota and Devon; the Devons entered service with the RNZAF from 1948), multi-engine conversion courses (Oxford and Devon), and general transport flying around New Zealand and the South Pacific region. During the visit of Queen Elizabeth in 1953/54, 42 Squadron Dakotas carried her around New Zealand. In the late 1950s the squadron's inventory comprised only Dakotas and Devons, and in the mid-1960s the Dakota fleet was enlarged to six aircraft.

The reliable but aging Dakotas were retired in 1977 and replaced by four Hawker Siddeley Andover twin-engine transports. Two were converted to full VIP configuration; one was semi-converted and one remained in the utility configuration.

To accommodate the reformed No. 2 Squadron RNZAF and its Douglas A-4 Skyhawks at Ohakea in 1984, 42 Squadron moved to RNZAF Whenuapai near Auckland and absorbed the Andovers of No. 1 Squadron which was disbanded. The squadron then had ten Andovers.

Peacekeeping role 
In 1988 a Hawker Siddeley Andover joined the United Nations Iran–Iraq Military Observer Group (UNIIMOG). The detachment of 17 personnel and aircraft were based at Tehran until withdrawn in December 1990. In 1993 three 42 Squadron Andovers went to Somalia to join the United States-led Unified Task Force (UNTAF). Based at Mogadishu, they flew air transport support missions for the force.

Training Role 

Four Andovers were withdrawn from service in 1997 and the remainder in 1998. They were replaced by leased Beechcraft Model B200 King Airs. The leasing of aircraft was a new venture for the RNZAF, with a commercial contractor providing maintenance support to the aircraft on site. The workload for the aircraft is multi-engine conversion training of pilots qualified to fly single engine aircraft, continuation training for multi-engine qualified pilots and a limited VIP transport role around New Zealand.

A photo of NZ2351, the first of the King Airs, at Ohakea in September 2018 can be seen here.

The squadron returned to Ohakea in January 2002. It continued operating four B200 King Airs as part of the flying training wing. In 2018 the RNZAF leased four King Air 350 aircraft to replace the King Air 200 aircraft operated by No.42 Squadron, with the first aircraft arriving at Ohakea in April 2018.

In July 2020, New Zealand Minister of Defence Ron Mark welcomed the delivery of the fourth and final King Air 350 to Ohakea, bringing No.42 Squadron back up to full operating capability. Two of the four aircraft are permanently fitted with sensor suites, allowing for training of aircrew officers as well as multi-engine pilot training. Previously RNZAF aircrew officers were trained in Australia under an agreement with the RAAF.

See also 
 437 (Husky) Transport Squadron and 412 Transport Squadron
 No. 32 (The Royal) Squadron
 No. 34 Squadron RAAF
 No. 38 Squadron RAAF

References

External links 
 No. 42 Sqn RNZAF
 42 Squadron History
 Flickr.com, Super King Air, Warbirds over Wanaka, September 2020

42
Squadrons of the RNZAF in World War II
Air force transport squadrons
Military units and formations established in 1943
Air transport of heads of state